1940 in professional wrestling describes the year's events in the world of professional wrestling.

List of notable promotions 
Only one promotion held notable shows in 1940.

Calendar of notable shows

Notable events
June 23  The first Lucha de Apuestas (Spanish for "Bet match") takes place in Mexico with El Murciélago Enmascarado defeated Merced Gómez to force Gómez to be shaved bald. If he had lost El Murciélago Enmascarado would have had to unmask. The Lucha de Apuestas match would become the most prestigious match type in Mexico subsequently.

Championship changes

EMLL

Lucha de Apuestas matches

Births
Date of birth unknown
Espectro II(died in 1985) 
Chris Markoff 
January 2  Motoko Baba(died in 2018) 
January 15  Tommy Gilbert(died in 2015)
February 5  Luke Graham(died in 2006)
February 11  Espanto III(died in 1996)
March 24  The Spoiler(died in 2006)
March 25  Joe Carollo
April 7  Bruce Swayze 
April 20  El Matematico
June 16  Sweet Daddy Siki 
June 20  Umanosuke Ueda(died in 2011)
July 4  Bob Sweetan(died in 2017)
July 18  Dean Ho (died in 2021)
July 23  Tsuneharu Sugiyama (died in 2002) 
August 20  Ken Lucas(died in 2014)
August 25  Wilhelm von Homburg (died in 2004) 
August 29  Wim Ruska (died in 2015) 
September 3  Spiros Arion
September 15  Man Mountain Mike(died in 1988)
October 15  Kay Noble (died in 2006) 
October 17  Baron Von Raschke
October 21  Crusher Verdu (died in 2004) 
October 28  Les Thatcher
November 5  Aníbal(died in 1994)
November 30  Johnny De Fazio (died in 2021) 
December 5  Adrian Street
December 15  Strong Kobayashi (died in 2021)

Deaths
March 26  Dan Koloff 47
June 27  Emil Klank 64
August 29  Renato Gardini 51
October 10  Harold Angus 35
November 21  Ivan Linow 52

References

 
professional wrestling